Hu Huaibang (born 25 September 1955) is a Chinese former banker. He was chairman of the China Development Bank, a Fortune Global 500 company. He was expelled from the Chinese Communist Party in January 2020 and sentenced to life in prison in January 2021 for corruption.

Career
He earned a bachelor's degree in economics from Jilin University, and a PhD in economics from the Shanxi University of Finance and Economics in 1999. In 2000 he began working for the People's Bank of China, the central bank. He was posted in Chengdu, then Xi'an. He then joined the China Banking Regulatory Commission as a discipline official and a member of the party committee. In September 2008 he became chairman of the Bank of Communications. In April 2013 he was named chairman of the China Development Bank.

Hu was an alternate member of the 18th Central Committee of the Chinese Communist Party.

Investigation and conviction
On 31 July 2019, he was placed under investigation for alleged "serious violations of (Communist Party) discipline and law", said in a statement by the Central Commission for Discipline Inspection, the Chinese Communist Party's top anti-graft agency. 

Allegedly involved in the corruption cases of Wang Sanyun and Ye Jianming, he was expelled from the Communist Party on 11 January 2020. On 12 February, he was arrested for suspected bribe taking. On 3 March, he was indicted on suspicion of accepting bribes. On 30 July, he stood trial at the Chengde Intermediate People's Court on charges of taking bribes. The public prosecutors accused him of taking advantage of his various positions, including chairman of the Bank of Communications, or convenient conditions brought by his power and status, to seek benefits for companies or institutes and individuals in obtaining and increasing bank credit line, establishing auto financing companies and job promotions between 2009 and 2019. In return, he received money and gifts worth more than 85.52 million yuan (about US$12.2 million).

On 7 January 2021, China Central Television reported that Hu had been convicted and given a life sentence for corruption by the Chengde Intermediate People's Court. The court described this as a light punishment due to mitigating circumstances: Hu had confessed and cooperated with prosecutors. The court also ordered the seizure of Hu's assets and indicated that Hu had already returned the 85.5 million yuan that he had received in bribes.

Personal life
On 12 February, Hu was arrested and his case was transferred to the procuratorate for further investigation and prosecution.

References

1955 births
Living people
Jilin University alumni
People's Republic of China economists
Chinese bankers
Bank of Communications people
China Development Bank people
Politicians from Zhoukou
Economists from Henan
People's Republic of China politicians from Henan
Chinese Communist Party politicians from Henan
Alternate members of the 18th Central Committee of the Chinese Communist Party